Cassadaga (a Seneca Indian word meaning "Water beneath the rocks") is a small unincorporated community located in Volusia County, Florida, United States, just north of Deltona. It is especially known for having many psychics and mediums, and has consequently been named the "Psychic Capital of the World".

History of Cassadaga  
The Cassadaga Spiritualist Camp began circa 1875, when the Southern Cassadaga Spiritualist Camp Meeting Association was founded by George P. Colby, from Pike, New York, a trance medium who traveled to many different states, giving readings and seances. He was well known and in his travels was referred to as the "seer of spiritualism." Colby attended summer Spiritualist Camp meetings at Lily Dale, New York, the town adjacent to Cassadaga, New York that would lend its name to the Florida community.

Colby worked with several spirit guides who would give him knowledge. One of his spirit guides was a Native American named Seneca, who had manifested to Colby during a seance in Lake Mills, Iowa. According to Colby, Seneca had instructed him to travel south to Florida, where he eventually arrived at a place called the Blue Springs Landing, near Orange City, Florida. According to Colby, the area that Seneca had led him to was the same area that Colby had seen during the seance in Iowa.

Colby had arrived in Florida in 1875, and on December 18, 1894, the charter was granted to form The Southern Cassadaga Spiritualist Camp Meeting Association. Later, on January 3, 1895, Colby had signed a warranty deed to the association for thirty-five acres. The people who came to the Spiritualist Camp in the early days of its formation were affluent and well educated. The association later received additional acreage that expanded the camp to the current fifty-seven acres.

The Cassadaga Camp today
Today, the Camp features the Cassadaga Hotel, a central auditorium, The Colby Memorial Temple, a community library, the Caesar Forman Healing Center, a Camp bookstore, a welcome center, and the Andrew Jackson Davis Educational building, used for musical performances and gatherings. Nearby is Colby-Alderman Park.

The principles of spirituality that are taught by the people at Cassadaga state, "Spiritualism has no dogma or creed, just a simple set of nine principles to help guide our lives". According to the teachings of spiritualism, it is the "science, philosophy, and religion based upon the principle of continuous life".  On March 14, 1991, the Southern Cassadaga Spiritualist Camp was declared a U.S. Historic District. The Cassadaga Spiritualist Camp is a federal tax-exempt church currently governed by a board of trustees.

Popular culture 
 Bright Eyes has an album called Cassadaga, which features the town in the lyrics of the single "Four Winds".
 Tom Petty's song "Casa Dega" alludes to psychics
 Gemma Hayes has a song entitled "Lucky One (Bird of Cassadaga)" on her debut album Night on My Side 
 A lengthy chapter in Stanley Elkin's novel George Mills takes place in Cassadaga.
 Served as the inspiration for the town called Grange in the Carl Hiaasen novel Lucky You.
 Investigated in the 2008 BBC documentary Around the World in 80 Faiths (Episode 5, Faith #43)
 The town is briefly mentioned in the 2009 movie Cirque du Freak: The Vampire's Assistant .
 Featured in the August 2010 episode of The Glades on the A&E Network
 Parts of the town were featured in the film Dunsmore released in 2003 and directed by Peter Spirer.
 The film Cassadaga is set in and took its inspiration from the town's history.
 Cherie Priest's novel Brimstone is largely set in Cassadaga in the 1920s.
 Freakylinks episode "The Harbingers'", aired January 5, 2001, was set in Cassadaga, FL. after being alluded to in a book called 'The Harbingers' under the alias "Valley Vista".
 The Amy Hempel story “Cloudland” takes place, in part, in Cassadaga.
 The town is mentioned in the Heather Graham novel Unhallowed Ground chapter 10, 
 Extensively investigated by Jamie Loftus in the podcast Ghost Church.

See also 
 Cassadaga, New York
 Seneca tribe
 Southern Cassadaga Spiritualist Camp Historic District
 Spiritualism
 The Devil's chair

References 
 Cassadaga, Florida: A Guide to the World’s Psychic Capital
 Guthrie, John J. Jr., Phillip Charles Lucas, and Gary Monroe (editors). 2000. Cassadaga: the South’s Oldest Spiritualist Community. Gainesville, FL : University Press of Florida.

Notes

External links 

 Official website of the town and Cassadaga Spiritualist Camp
 "Visiting The Psychic Capital Of The World", Bill Geist, CBS Sunday Morning, December 30, 2007.
 Aerial photo at Google Maps

Unincorporated communities in Volusia County, Florida
Spiritualist communities in the United States
Populated places established in 1894
Unincorporated communities in Florida